Deus Ex Machina is the debut album of composer Paul Schütze, released in 1989 through Extreme Records.

Track listing

Personnel
John Baldwin – illustrations
Steve Burgess – instruments, engineering
Paul Schütze – instruments, production, art direction
Virginia Trioli – vocals
Gareth Vanderhope – instruments
Melissa Webb – art direction

References

External links 
 

1989 debut albums
Extreme Records albums
Albums produced by Paul Schütze
Paul Schütze albums
Sound collage albums